Salajidin Akramjan (born 12 March 1991) is a Chinese footballer currently playing as a goalkeeper for Yanbian Longding.

Career statistics

Club
.

References

1991 births
Living people
Chinese footballers
Association football goalkeepers
China League One players
Xinjiang Tianshan Leopard F.C. players